The 1949–50 British Ice Hockey season featured the English National League and Scottish National League.

English National League

English Autumn Cup

Results

English National Tournament

Results

Scottish National League

Regular season

Playoffs
Semifinals
Fife Flyers - Paisley Pirates 9:7 on aggregate (4:4, 5:3)
Dunfermline Vikings - Falkirk Lions 3:5 on aggregate (2:1, 1:4)
Final
Fife Flyers - Falkirk Lions 5:7 on aggregate (4:1, 1:6)

Scottish Cup

Results
First round
Dunfermline Vikings - Paisley Pirates 11:9 on aggregate (6:6, 5:3)
Falkirk Lions - Ayr Raiders 15:7 on aggregate (4:3, 11:4)
Dundee Tigers - Perth Panthers 13:11 on aggregate (7:6, 6:5)
Semifinals
Fife Flyers - Falkirk Lions 11:8 on aggregate (8:1, 3:7) 
Dunfermline Vikings - Dundee Tigers 7:7 on aggregate (5:4, 2:3 OT*)
(*Match was 3-2 for Dundee, but the aggregate score was 7:7, so overtime was played to break the tie. After two scoreless 10 minute overtime periods, it was decided to call it a night. The semifinal series was then replayed.) 
Dunfermline Vikings - Dundee Tigers 10:9 on aggregate (4:2, 6:7)
Final
Dunfermline Vikings - Fife Flyers 12:11 on aggregate (4:6, 8:5)

Canada Cup

Results

References 

British
1949 in English sport
1950 in English sport
1949–50 in British ice hockey
1949 in Scottish sport
1950 in Scottish sport